Francis Borelli (8 April 1932 – 2 October 2007) was a French businessman. He was the chairman of Paris Saint-Germain from 1978 to 1991.

Parc des Princes 
The west stand of the Parc des Princes is named in honour of Borelli.

References 

1932 births
2007 deaths
20th-century French businesspeople
French people of Italian descent
Paris Saint-Germain F.C. presidents

French football chairmen and investors